Michael Craig van Arsdale (born June 20, 1965, Waterloo, Iowa, United States) is an American former professional mixed martial artist. A professional from 1998 until 2006, he competed for the UFC, International Vale Tudo Championship, and the World Fighting Alliance. He was the winner of the IVC 4 Heavyweight Tournament.

Background
Born and raised in Waterloo, Iowa, van Arsdale has a very decorated background in wrestling. He attended Waterloo West High School, and compiled a record of 20–6 as a sophomore, went 28–2 while also winning a state championship as a junior, and then went 27–3 while being a state-runner up in his senior year. Van Arsdale then won a Junior National title and was a Junior World runner-up title before continuing his career in college at Iowa State University. A first-team freshman All-American, van Arsdale placed sixth in the NCAA tournament as a sophomore (1985) and placed third in his junior season (1986). After college, van Arsdale won a World Cup Championship in 1991, a CISM (military) World Championship, was a two-time Olympic alternate, and a six-time member of the National Freestyle Wrestling team. van Arsdale was inducted into the Iowa Wrestling Hall of Fame in 2011.

Mixed martial arts career

Early career
van Arsdale's professional mixed martial arts debut came in 1998 when he traveled to Brazil to compete in the no-rules International Vale Tudo Championship, a tournament in which van Arsdale won three consecutive fights in one evening to claim the title.

His first career loss was in his fifth professional fight, when he was knocked out by Wanderlei Silva.

UFC
With a record of 7–1, van Arsdale signed with the UFC and made his debut for the organization on May 15, 1998 against Gracie Jiu-jitsu representative Joe Pardo, defeating him via submission. He would compete for the UFC next on April 16, 2005 against John Marsh at UFC 52. Van Arsdale won via unanimous decision.

His next appearance was at UFC 54 on August 20, 2005 against UFC Hall of Famer Randy Couture. He was defeated via submission in the third round.

van Arsdale fought again on February 4, 2006 at UFC 57 against Renato "Babalu" Sobral and lost via rear-naked choke submission at 2:21 in the first round.

Coaching
van Arsdale was the head coach for the Blackzillians when the team was initially formed in 2011. He has since moved on from the team and is currently opening a new gym in Arizona.

Melvin Guillard, former UFC Lightweight and former student of van Arsdale, stirred controversy by saying that he was "glad" that van Arsdale left the Blackzilians camp.

Personal life
van Arsdale has five children.

Championships and accomplishments
George Tragos/Lou Thesz Professional Wrestling Hall of Fame
George Tragos Award (2017)
International Vale Tudo Championship
IVC 4 Heavyweight Tournament Winner

Mixed martial arts record

|-
| Loss
| align=center| 8–5
| Matt Lindland
| Submission (guillotine choke)
| Raze MMA: Fight Night
| 
| align=center| 1
| align=center| 3:38
| California, United States
| 
|-
| Loss
| align=center| 8–4
| Jorge Oliveira
| Submission (triangle choke)
| PFA: Pride and Fury 4
| 
| align=center| 1
| align=center| 4:02
| Idaho, United States
| 
|-
| Loss
| align=center| 8–3
| Renato Sobral
| Submission (rear-naked choke)
| UFC 57: Liddell vs. Couture 3
| 
| align=center| 1
| align=center| 2:21
| Nevada, United States
| 
|-
| Loss
| align=center| 8–2
| Randy Couture
| Submission (anaconda choke)
| UFC 54
| 
| align=center| 3
| align=center| 0:52
| Nevada, United States
|
|-
| Win
| align=center| 8–1
| John Marsh
| Decision (unanimous)
| UFC 52
| 
| align=center| 3
| align=center| 5:00
| Nevada, United States
| 
|-
| Win
| align=center| 7–1
| Emanuel Newton
| Submission (kimura)
| MMA Mexico: Day 1
| 
| align=center| 1
| align=center| 1:35
| Mexico
| 
|-
| Win
| align=center| 6–1
| Mario Lopez
| Submission (crucifix)
| EP: XXXtreme Impact
| 
| align=center| 1
| align=center| 0:28
| Mexico
| 
|-
| Win
| align=center| 5–1
| Chris Haseman
| TKO (strikes)
| WFA 3: Level 3
| 
| align=center| 2
| align=center| 3:10
| Nevada, United States
| 
|-
| Loss
| align=center| 4–1
| Wanderlei Silva
| KO (punch and kick)
| IVC 6: The Challenge
| 
| align=center| 1
| align=center| 4:00
| Brazil
| 
|-
| Win
| align=center| 4–0
| Joe Pardo
| Submission (armlock)
| UFC 17
| 
| align=center| 1
| align=center| 11:01
| Alabama, United States
|
|-
| Win
| align=center| 3–0
| Dario Amorim
| Submission (shoulder injury)
| rowspan=3|IVC 4: The Battle
| rowspan=3|
| align=center| 1
| align=center| 2:42
| rowspan=3|Brazil
| 
|-
| Win
| align=center| 2–0
| Marcelo Barbosa
| Submission (punches)
| align=center| 1
| align=center| 3:36
| 
|-
| Win
| align=center| 1–0
| Francisco Nonato
| Submission (keylock)
| align=center| 1
| align=center| 5:42
|

Submission grappling record
KO PUNCHES
|- style="text-align:center; background:#f0f0f0;"
| style="border-style:none none solid solid; "|Result
| style="border-style:none none solid solid; "|Opponent
| style="border-style:none none solid solid; "|Method
| style="border-style:none none solid solid; "|Event
| style="border-style:none none solid solid; "|Date
| style="border-style:none none solid solid; "|Round
| style="border-style:none none solid solid; "|Time
| style="border-style:none none solid solid; "|Notes
|-
|Win|| Renato Verisimo || Decision || The Contenders|| 1997|| 5|| 5:00||
|-

References

External links
 
 
 Mike Van Arsdale at the National Wrestling Hall of Fame

American male mixed martial artists
Light heavyweight mixed martial artists
Mixed martial artists utilizing collegiate wrestling
Mixed martial artists utilizing freestyle wrestling
Living people
1965 births
Sportspeople from Waterloo, Iowa
Iowa State Cyclones wrestlers
Ultimate Fighting Championship male fighters
American male sport wrestlers